Johnson-Hubbard House is a historic home located at Wilkesboro, Wilkes County, North Carolina. It was built between about 1855 and 1857, and is a two-story, five bay, vernacular Greek Revival style frame dwelling with a one-story rear ell. It features brick end chimneys with single paved shoulders and stuccoed surfaces penciled to resemble cut stone.

It was listed on the National Register of Historic Places in 1982.

References

Houses on the National Register of Historic Places in North Carolina
Greek Revival houses in North Carolina
Houses completed in 1857
Houses in Wilkes County, North Carolina
National Register of Historic Places in Wilkes County, North Carolina
1857 establishments in North Carolina